The first season of the American superhero television series Superman & Lois aired on The CW from February 23, 2021, with a two-hour event, and finished on August 17, 2021. The series is based on the DC Comics characters Superman and Lois Lane, created by Jerry Siegel and Joe Shuster, and produced by Berlanti Productions, DC Entertainment, and Warner Bros. Television. Initially considered to be part of the shared fictional Arrowverse, where Hoechlin and Tulloch originated their roles, with crossovers with Supergirl and Batwoman being developed during the first season before being cancelled due to the COVID-19 pandemic, it was determined towards the end of the filming of the first season to have the series be set in an alternate universe from the Arrowverse, which was confirmed by the end of the second season.

The series stars Tyler Hoechlin and Elizabeth Tulloch as the titular characters, Clark Kent/Superman, a costumed superhero, and his wife, Lois Lane, as they struggle with the trials and tribulations of being parents, while facing the mysterious Captain Luthor and Morgan Edge. Hoechlin and Tulloch are joined by main cast members Jordan Elsass, Alex Garfin, Erik Valdez, Inde Navarrette, Wolé Parks, Adam Rayner, Dylan Walsh, and Emmanuelle Chriqui. Superman & Lois was picked for a full season by The CW in January 2020 and filming took place primarily in Surrey, British Columbia.

The pilot episode was watched by 1.75 million viewers, the second-best premiere of any CW series since the debut of Batwoman in October 2019. The season received generally positive reviews from critics and fans alike. Superman & Lois was renewed for a second season in March 2021.

Cast and characters

Main
 Tyler Hoechlin as Kal-El / Clark Kent / Superman
 Hoechlin also portrays an evil version of Superman from another Earth that works for his world's Morgan Edge.
 Elizabeth Tulloch as Lois Lane
 Tulloch also portrays a version of Lois Lane who was married to John Henry Irons and died at the hands of her world's Superman.
 Jordan Elsass as Jonathan Kent
 Alex Garfin as Jordan Kent
 Garfin also portrays Zeta-Rho when in the body of Jordan Kent.
 Erik Valdez as Kyle Cushing
 Inde Navarrette as Sarah Cushing
 Wolé Parks as John Henry Irons / Captain Luthor / The Stranger
 Parks' image was also used to portray Earth-Prime's John Henry Irons, who is mentioned to have been killed in action.
 Adam Rayner as Morgan Edge / Tal-Rho / Eradicator
 Dylan Walsh as Samuel Lane
 Walsh also portrays a version of Sam Lane who was killed in conflict against his world's version of Superman.
 Emmanuelle Chriqui as Lana Lang Cushing
 Chriqui also portrays Kal-El and Tal-Rho's mother, Lara Lor-Van, in the body of Lana Lang.

Recurring
 Joselyn Picard as Sophie Cushing
 Daisy Tormé as A.I. Device
 Fritzy Klevans-Destine as Sean Smith
 Wern Lee as Tag Harris
 Zane Clifford as Timmy Ryan
 Stacey Farber as Leslie Larr
 Sofia Hasmik as Chrissy Beppo
 Angus Macfadyen as Jor-El

Guest
 Michele Scarabelli as Martha Kent
 Fred Henderson as Jonathan Kent Sr.
 Danny Wattley as Gaines
 Daniel Cudmore as David Fuglestad / Subjekt-11
 Clayton James as Derek Powell
 Brendan Fletcher as Thaddeus Kilgrave
 David Ramsey as John Diggle

Episodes

Production

Development 
Announced in October 2019, the executive producers for Superman & Lois were named as Todd Helbing, Greg Berlanti, Sarah Schecter and Geoff Johns around the same time. Helbing also penning the script for the series. The first season of the series was officially ordered by January 14, 2020, by The CW and was originally supposed to consist of 13 episodes. However, in January 2021, the television network ordered an additional two episodes, moving the episode count up to 15. On March 2, 2021, The CW renewed the series for a second season.

The pilot episode of Superman & Lois aired on February 23, 2021, with an encore presentation on February 27, on the cable network TNT, followed by the special, Superman & Lois: Legacy of Hope, which features behind the scenes footage, interviews with the cast, and special guests discussing the legacy of Superman. CTV Sci-Fi Channel will air the series in Canada. After a delay in production caused by COVID-19, the series went on hiatus after the fifth episode, during which the sixth season of Supergirl will take over the seasons' timeslot.

Writing 
In November 2020, series writer Nadria Trucker was fired after "pushing back on racist and sexist storylines" and working on all 15 episodes of the first season. In March 2021, after her firing, Trucker revealed that she "actually finished out [her part] the first season of the show" and her departure did not greatly affect production.

Casting 
In October 2019, along with the series' announcement before it was officially ordered, Tyler Hoechlin and Elizabeth Tulloch were set to reprise their roles of Clark Kent and Lois Lane from Supergirl. By February of the next year, Jordan Elsass and Alexander Garfin were cast as Clark and Lois' sons Jonathan Kent and Jordan Kent, respectively. In April, the role of Samuel Lane was recast to Dylan Walsh. Emmanuelle Chriqui and Erik Valdez were cast the same month as Lana Lang and Kyle Cushing, respectively. The next month, Wolé Parks was cast as Captain Luthor while Inde Navarrette was cast as Sarah Cushing. Additionally, Adam Rayner portrays Morgan Edge, who was previously portrayed by Adrian Pasdar in Supergirl.

In October 2020, Sofia Hasmik and Stacey Farber were cast in the recurring roles of Chrissy Beppo and Leslie Larr, respectively. In December 2020, David Ramsey was revealed to be reprising his Arrow role of John Diggle in addition to directing at least one episode in the series.

Filming 
After COVID-19 pandemic-related delays force production to be put on hold from a late March 2020 start date, in late July 2020, Warner Bros. Television planned for the Vancouver-based production to restart in late August. Filming finally began on October 21, 2020, and is expected to conclude on June 14, 2021. The series is filmed on location in Surrey, British Columbia.

Design 
Helbing stated Superman's costume in the series would feature a more "classically comicbook-y" look from the previous costume used in Supergirl. It would also somewhat reminiscent of Superman's look in DC Rebirth with the texture of the costume being inspired by the DCEU version of Superman. The new suit is designed by Laura Jean Shannon. Hoechlin further elaborated:

Connection to the Arrowverse 
Speaking to the lack of greater Arrowverse connections in the first season, Helbing felt there was "this weird set of circumstances where, because of production or timing or COVID, everything in the show that was related to the Arrowverse has gotten pulled out". He added that as development progressed further away from the "Crisis on Infinite Earths" crossover, "it felt like we were opening a can of worms every time we had to explain the connection", though he was hopeful more connections or proper crossovers could occur in the second season. However, ultimately, while crossovers with Supergirl and Batwoman were considered and cancelled due to the COVID-19 pandemic, it was determined towards the end of the filming of the first season to have the series be set in an alternate universe from the Arrowverse, which was confirmed by the end of the second season.

Reception

Critical response 
On Rotten Tomatoes, the first season has an approval rating of 86% based on 44 reviews, with an average rating of 7.6/10. The website's critical consensus reads, "Though it may be a bit too grounded for some viewers, Superman & Lois draws strength from unexpected placeswithout skimping on the actionto carve its own path in a crowded superhero universe." On Metacritic, it has a weighted average score of 65 out of 100 based on 16 reviews, indicating "generally favorable reviews".

Screen Rant reviewed the premiere episode, saying "The pilot episode of Superman & Lois is filled with fan-pleasing moments, Easter eggs, callbacks to the comics, cool character moments, and exciting hints for the future. Nevertheless, while it was generally an excellent start to the series, it had some problems which will need to be addressed as the series progresses." IGN commented on the unique theme of the episode in Clark Kent and Lois Lane being parents, saying "Superman & Lois stands apart from all other versions of the Superman mythos in that it features this Dynamic Duo trying to raise twin teenage sons. The idea of Lois and Clark being parents isn't entirely new, as Jon Kent has become a mainstay of the Superman comics since 2015."

Ratings 
The pilot episode's viewership of 1.75 million viewers was the highest for a premiere of any CW series since the debut of Batwoman in October 2019 with 1.86 million viewers. In addition, the premiere was streamed by 716,000 households in the United States according to Samba TV. The premiere on BBC One garnered a viewership of 2.75 million households.

Release

Broadcast

The pilot episode of Superman & Lois aired on The CW and CTV Sci-Fi Channel on February 23, 2021, with an encore presentation on February 27, on the cable network TNT, followed by the special, Superman & Lois: Legacy of Hope, which features behind the scenes footage, interviews with the cast, and special guests discussing the legacy of Superman. The finale aired on August 17, 2021.

In the United Kingdom, the season premiered on BBC One and BBC iPlayer on December 4, 2021.

Home media
The entire first season of Superman & Lois became available on HBO Max on September 17, 2021. It was released on Blu-ray and DVD in the US on October 19, 2021, with extended versions of all episodes.

References

External links 
 

Superman & Lois seasons
2021 American television seasons